Dimitrios Seletopoulos (born 28 May 1963) is a Greek former water polo player who competed in the 1984 Los Angeles Summer Olympics, in the 1988 Seoul Summer Olympics, and in the 1992 Barcelona Summer Olympics.

References

1963 births
Living people
Greek male water polo players
Panathinaikos swimmers
Olympic water polo players of Greece
Panathinaikos Water Polo Club players
Water polo players at the 1984 Summer Olympics
Water polo players at the 1988 Summer Olympics
Water polo players at the 1992 Summer Olympics